The 14th Pan American Games were held in Santo Domingo, Dominican Republic, from 1 to 17 August 2003.

Medals

Gold

Men's 110 m hurdles: Yuniel Hernández
Men's long jump: Iván Pedroso
Men's triple jump: Yoandri Betanzos
Men's javelin: Emeterio González
Women's 200 metres: Roxana Díaz
Women's 800 metres: Adriana Muñoz
Women's 1,500 metres: Adriana Muñoz
Women's triple jump: Mabel Gay
Women's shot put: Yumileidi Cumbá
Women's hammer throw: Yipsi Moreno

Men's tournament: Francisco Alvarez and Juan Rossell
Women's tournament: Dalixia Fernández and Tamara Larrea

Men's tournament: Cuba

Women's tournament: Yudith Aguila, Suchitel Avila, Yayma Boulet, Ariadna Capiró, Liset Castillo, Milaisis Duanys, Oyanaisis Gelis, Yamilé Martínez, Yaquelín Plutín, Yulianne Rodríguez, Taimara Suero and Lisdeivis Víctores.

Men's light flyweight (– 48 kg): Yan Bartelemí
Men's flyweight (– 51 kg): Yuriolkis Gamboa
Men's bantamweight (– 54 kg): Guillermo Rigondeaux
Men's lightweight (– 60 kg): Mario Kindelán
Men's welterweight (– 69 kg): Lorenzo Aragón
Men's heavyweight (– 91 kg): Odlanier Solis

Men's K2 1,000 m: Lancy Martínez and Yoel Mendoza
Men's K4 1,000 m: Oslay Calzadilla, Andi Sicilia, Lancy Martínez and Yoel Mendoza
Men's C1 500 m: Karel Aguilar
Men's C2 500 m: Ledis Balceiro and Ibrahim Rojas
Men's C2 1,000 m: Ledis Balceiro and Ibrahim Rojas

Men's team sprint: Ahmed López, Reinier Cartaya and Yosmani Poll
Men's time trial: Ahmed López
Women's individual road race: Yoanka González

Men's épée individual: Camilo Boris
Men's épée team: Camilo Boris, Andrés Carrillo and Nelson Loyola
Women's épée individual: Eimey Gómez
Women's épée team: Eimey Gómez, Zuleydis Ortíz and Misleidis Oña

Men's all-around: Eric López
Men's parallel bars: Eric López
Men's pommel horse: Eric López
Men's rings: Eric López
Men's vault: Eric López
Men's team: Cuba
Women's vault: Leyanet González

Men's 25 m rapid fire pistol: Leuris Pupo
Women's 50 m rifle 3 positions: Eglis Yaima Cruz
Women's 10 m air rifle: Eglis Yaima Cruz

Women's – 49 kg: Yanelis Yuliet Ladrada

Men's – 69 kg: Yordanis Borrero

Silver

Men's 400 metres: Yeimer López
Men's long jump: Luis Felipe Méliz
Men's discus throw: Frank Casañas
Men's javelin: Isbel Luaces
Women's 10,000 metres: Yudelkis Martínez
Women's marathon: Mariela González
Women's 400 m hurdles: Daimí Pernía
Women's 4x100 metres: Dainelky Pérez, Roxana Díaz, Virgen Benavides and Misleidys Lazo
Women's discus throw: Ana Elys Fernández
Women's hammer throw: Yunaika Crawford

Men's middleweight (– 75 kg): Yordanis Despaigne
Men's light heavyweight (– 81 kg): Yoan Pablo Hernández
Men's super heavyweight (+ 91 kg): Michel López Núñez

Men's individual road race: Pedro Pablo Pérez
Women's individual pursuit: Yoanka González

Men's foil team: Nelson Loyola, Raúl Perojo, Reinier Suárez and Abraham O'Reilly

Men's parallel bars: Abel Driggs
Men's horizontal bar: Michael Brito

Women's group ribbon: Cuba
Women's group hoop-ball: Cuba

Men's 50 m pistol: Arseny Borrero
Men's 25 m rapid fire pistol: Juan Francisco Pérez
Men's 50 m rifle prone: Reiner Estipinan
Men's skeet: Guillermo Alfredo Torres
Women's 25 m pistol: Margarita Tarradel

Men's – 68 kg: Yosvani Pérez

Women's tournament: Yumilka Ruiz, Indira Mestre, Yanelis Santos, Nancy Carrillo, Martha Sánchez, Zoila Barros, Anniara Muñoz, Liana Mesa, Marbelis Martínez, Yaima Ortiz, Katia Guevara, Azurrima Álvarez

Men's – 62 kg: Vladimir Rodríguez
Men's – 85 kg: Yoandry Hernández
Men's – 105 kg: Michel Batista

Bronze

Men's 4x100 metres: José Ángel César, José Carlos Peña, Luis Alexander Reyes and Juan Pita
Men's triple jump: Yoelbi Quesada
Men's discus throw: Loy Martínez
Men's hammer throw: Yosvany Suárez
Men's decathlon: Yonelvis Águila
Women's high jump: Yarianny Argüelles
Women's long jump: Yargelis Savigne
Women's triple jump: Yusmay Bicet
Women's discus throw: Yania Ferrales
Women's javelin: Osleidys Menéndez
Women's heptathlon: Magalys García

Men's featherweight (– 57 kg): Yosvani Aguilera

Women's individual road race: Yeilin Fernández
Women's keirin: Yumari González
Women's points race: Yoanka González

Men's foil individual: Raúl Perojo
Men's foil individual: Reinier Suárez
Men's sabre team: Abel Caballero, Yunior Naranjo, Candido Maya and Abraham O'Reilly
Women's foil individual: Arianne Ribot
Women's sabre individual: Ana Faez

Men's rings: Abel Driggs

Men's kumite (– 62 kg): Yusei Padron
Men's kumite (– 68 kg): Yordanis Torres

Men's 50 m pistol: Norbelis Bárzaga

Men's – 69 kg: Aristoteles Fuentes

Results by event

Athletics

Track

Road

Field

Decathlon

Heptathlon

Yarianni Argüelles
Virgen Benavides
Yoandris Betanzos
Yusmay Bicet
Zulia Inés Calatayud
José Ángel César
Roxana Tomasa Díaz
Alianny Echevarría
Anier García
Glauder Garzón
Mabel Gay
Libania Grenot
Yuniel Hernández
Sergio Hierrezuelo
Yanelis Lara
Misleidys Lazo
Luis Felipe Méliz
Yahumara Neyra
Iván Pedroso
José Carlos Peña
Katiuska Pérez
Lisvany Arlys Pérez
Dainelky Pérez
Juan Pita
Yoelbi Quesada
Luis Alexander Reyes
Aguelmis Rojas
Yargelis Savigne
Anay Tejeda

Baseball

Men's tournament
Ariel Pestano
Roger Machado
Alexander Ramos
Manuel Benavides
Eduardo Paret
Joan Carlos Pedroso
Michel Enríquez
Yulieski Gourriel
Carlos Tabares
Osmani Urrutia
Frederich Cepeda
Roberquis Videux
Javier Méndez
Adiel Palma
Vladimir Hernández
Norge Luis Vera
Orelvis Ávila
Vicyohandri Odelín
Yadel Martí
Yosvani Aragón

Basketball

Women's tournament
Preliminary round
Defeated United States (84-62)
Defeated Dominican Republic (82-55)
Defeated Argentina (83-57)
Defeated Canada (81-66)
Lost to Brazil (70-79)
Semifinal
Defeated Canada (58-49)
Final
Defeated United States (75-64) → Gold medal
Team roster
Yudith Aguila
Suchitel Avila
Yaima Boulet
Ariadna Capiró
Liset Castillo
Milaisis Duanys
Oyanaisis Gelis
Yamilé Martínez
Yaquelín Plutín
Yulianne Rodríguez
Taimara Suero
Lisdeivis Víctores

Boxing

Canoeing
Karel Aguilar
Arasai Andino
Ledis Frank Balceiro
Oslay Calzadilla
Anaysis Carrillo
Yaumara Chaves
Lanci Martínez
Yoel Mendoza
Yulitza Meneces
Yaneisi Meriño
Eliecer Ordoñes
Aldo Pruna
Ibrahim Rojas
Andi Sicilia

Cycling
Yudelmis Domínguez
Yeilien Fernández
Yoanka González
Yumari González
Yosvany Jesús Gutiérrez
Julio César Herrera
Ahmed López
Joel Mariño
Damián Martínez
Michel Pedroso
Pedro Pablo Pérez
Yosmani Pol
Luis Romero

Diving
Jesús Iory Aballí
Jorge Betancourt
Iohana Cruz
Erick Fornaris
Yolanda Ortiz

Fencing
Camilo Boris
Abel Caballero
Andrés Carrillo
Ana Faez
Eimey Gómez
Maylin González
Odalys Gorguet
Nelson Loyola
Cándido Maya
Yunior Naranjo
Misleydis Oña
Abraham Orrelly
Zuleydis Ortiz
Raúl Perojo
Arianne Ribot
Reinier Suárez

Field hockey

Men's tournament
Alexander Abréu
Alain Bardají
Juan Carlos Benavides
Yoandy Blanco
Yoel Gómez
José Gómez Pelaez
Iosvany Hernández
Rolando Larrinaga
Yuani Larrondo
Roberto Carlos Lemus
Yumay Oliva
Yuri Pérez
Yuniel Rodríguez
Yanker Rojas
Edel Beny Sayas
Yuniel Villanueva

Football

Men's tournament
Reinier Alcántara
Julio Aldama
Lázaro Alfonso
Lázaro Arocha
Yusvany Caballero
Alain Cervantes
Yunier Escalona
Luis Maykel Estrada
Pedro Faife
Reysander Fernández
Maikel Galindo
Carlos Madrigal
Eduardo Morales
Jensy Muñoz
Yulier Olivera
Lázaro Reyes
Nayuri Rivero
Sandro Sevillano

Gymnastics

Artistic
Michael Brito
Janerki de la Peña
Abel Drigg
Daylet Girot
Leyanet González
Mónica La Rosa
Lázaro Lamelas
Charles León
Eric López
Yurlanis Mendoza
Yaidelín Rojas
Yareimis Vázquez

Rhythmic
Arletis Chacón
Yanet Comas
Diana Díaz
Yenly Figueredo
Licelia Mederos
Kirenia Ruiz
Mirlay Sánchez

Judo
Yordanis Arencibia
Gabriel Arteaga
Dayma Beltrán
Danieska Carrión
Oreidis Despaigne
Yosvany Despaigne
Angelo Gómez
Driulys González
Yurisel Laborde
Regla Leyén
Yurieleidys Lupetey
Rubert Martínez
Amarilys Savón
Rigoberto Trujillo

Karate
Yaneya Gutiérrez
Yordanis Torres
Jorge Zaragoza
Yusei Padrón

Swimming

Men

Women

Gunther Rodríguez
Yojan Fidel García
Neisser Bent
Marcos Hernández
Juan Vargas

Triathlon

Weightlifting
Osley Pedroso
Aristóteles Fuentes
Yordani Borrero
Ernesto Quiroga
Joel Mackenzie
Michel Batista
Yoandris Hernández
Bladimir Rodríguez

Wrestling
Luis Méndez
Mijail Lopez
Yoel Romero
Lázaro Rivas
Roberto Monzón
Serguei Rondón
Wilfredo Morales
Alexis Rodríguez
Ernesto Peña
Filiberto Azcuy
Yandro Quintana
René Montero
Juan Luis Marén
Daniel González

See also
 Cuba at the 2004 Summer Olympics

References

Cuban delegation

Nations at the 2003 Pan American Games
P
2003